Pavel Valeryevich Durov (born 10 October 1984) is a Russian-born French-Emirati entrepreneur who is known for being the founder of the social networking site VK and Telegram Messenger. He is the younger brother of Nikolai Durov. For some years after his dismissal as CEO of VK in 2014, the Durov brothers travelled the world in self-imposed exile as citizens of Saint Kitts and Nevis. In 2017, Pavel joined the World Economic Forum (WEF) Young Global Leaders as a representative of Finland. Durov was naturalized as a French citizen in August 2021. , his net worth is estimated at US$15.1 billion. In 2022, he was recognized as the richest person in the United Arab Emirates according to Forbes. In February 2023, Arabian Business named him the most powerful entrepreneur in Dubai.

Early life and education
Pavel Durov was born in Leningrad, but spent most of his childhood in Turin, Italy, where his father was employed.  In 2006, he graduated from the Philology Department of the Saint Petersburg State University, where he received a first-class degree. Durov's early life and career are described in detail in the book The Durov Code. The True Story of VK and its Creator (2012).

Family
Pavel Durov's grandfather Semyon Petrovich Tulyakov fought in World War II. He served in the 65th Infantry Regiment, participated in the battles on the Leningrad front at Krasnoborsky, Gatchinsky and elsewhere, and was wounded three times, receiving the Order of the Red Star, the Order of the Patriotic War 2nd degree, and on the 40th Victory Day, the Order of the Great Patriotic War level I. After the war, he was arrested.

Durov's father Valery Semenovich Durov is a Doctor of Philological Sciences and the author of many academic papers. Since 1992, he has been head of the department of classical philology of philological faculty of Saint Petersburg State University.

Career

VK
In 2006, Durov started VKontakte with Ilya Perekopsky, later known as VK, which was initially influenced by Facebook. During the time when he and his brother Nikolai built up the VKontakte website, the company grew to a value of $3 billion.

In 2011, he was involved in a standoff with the police in Saint Petersburg when the government demanded the removal of opposition politicians' pages after the 2011 election to the Duma; Durov posted a picture of a dog with his tongue out wearing a hoodie and the police left after an hour when he did not answer the door.

In 2012, Durov publicly posted a picture of himself extending his middle finger and calling it his official response to Mail.ru Group's efforts to buy VK. In December 2013, Durov decided to sell his 12% to Ivan Tavrin (at that time 40% of the shares belonged to Mail.ru Group, and 48% to the United Capital Partners). Later, Tavrin resold these shares to Mail.ru Group.

Dismissal from VK
On 1 April 2014, Durov submitted his resignation to the board; at first, due to the fact the company confirmed he had resigned, it was believed to be related to the Russo-Ukrainian War which had started in February. However, Durov himself claimed it was an April Fool's Joke on 3 April 2014.

On 16 April 2014, Durov publicly refused to hand over the personal data of Ukrainian protesters to Russia's security agencies and block Alexei Navalny's page on VK. Instead, he posted the relevant orders on his own VK page, claiming that the requests were unlawful.

On 21 April 2014, Durov was dismissed as CEO of VK. The company claimed it was acting on his letter of resignation a month earlier that he failed to recall. Durov then claimed the company had been effectively taken over by Vladimir Putin's allies, suggesting his ouster was the result of both his refusal to hand over personal details of users to federal law enforcement and his refusal to hand over the personal details of people who were members of a VK group dedicated to the Euromaidan protest movement. Durov then left Russia and stated that he had "no plans to go back" and that "the country is incompatible with Internet business at the moment".

Telegram 
Upon leaving Russia, he obtained Saint Kitts and Nevis citizenship by donating $250,000 to the country's Sugar Industry Diversification Foundation and secured $300 million in cash within Swiss banks. This allowed him to focus on creating his next company, Telegram, focused on an encrypted messaging service of the same name. Telegram was headquartered in Berlin and later moved to Dubai. In January 2018 it was revealed that, in a bid to monetize the growing success of Telegram, Durov was launching the "Gram" cryptocurrency and the TON platform. It raised a total of $1.7 billion from investors. However, these ventures were halted by American regulator SEC which argued in courts that Grams bypassed U.S. financing laws and should return the money to its investors.

In 2018, Russia attempted to block Telegram, after the company refused to cooperate with Russian security services. A leaked letter by an FSB employee stated that the block was actually tied to the company's intention to launch the Telegram Open Network. During the attempted block period, the Russian Ministry of Foreign Affairs continued to operate official channels on the app. The block order was lifted in 2020, after two years of block attempts, which the service reportedly evaded using domain fronting. The stated reason was Telegram agreeing to "counter terrorism and extremism" on the platform.

Wealth 
Durov was listed on the Forbes Billionaires List in 2022, with a net worth of $15.1 billion. His fortune is largely driven by his ownership of Telegram. As of September 2022, Durov was the 104th richest person in the world.

Personal life 
According to Forbes, Durov is not married and has two children. He lives in Dubai.
In April 2021, he received United Arab Emirates citizenship.

Views
Durov is a self-described libertarian, teetotaler and vegetarian. Durov claims to have an ascetic lifestyle, and promotes freedom from personal possessions.

For his twenty-seventh birthday in 2011, he donated a million dollars to the Wikimedia Foundation, the founder and honorary chairman of which is fellow libertarian Jimmy Wales. In 2012, he published manifestos described by commentators as "libertarianism" detailing his ideas on improving Russia.

Accolades
Durov has been called the Mark Zuckerberg of Russia. In August 2014, Durov was named the most promising Northern European leader under 30. In 2017, he was chosen to join the WEF Young Global Leaders, representing Finland. On 21 June 2018, the Union of Kazakhstan's Journalists bestowed an award on Durov "for his principled position against censorship and the state's interference into citizens' free online correspondence." In 2018, Fortune magazine included Durov in their "40 Under 40" list, an annual ranking of the most influential young people in business. In February 2023, Durov was named the most powerful entrepreneur in Dubai by Arabian Business.

References

External links

 

Living people
Businesspeople in computing
Naturalised citizens of Saint Kitts and Nevis
French libertarians
Businesspeople from Saint Petersburg
Russian billionaires
Russian chief executives
Russian computer scientists
Russian emigrants to Saint Kitts and Nevis
Russian expatriates in Italy
Russian libertarians
Russian technology company founders
Saint Petersburg State University alumni
Telegram (software)
21st-century Russian businesspeople
1984 births